Mount Morning is a shield volcano at the foot of the Transantarctic Mountains in Victoria Land, Antarctica. A number of parasitic vents mainly in the form of cinder cones dot the mountain.

The volcano was initially active during the Miocene and erupted in two separate stages with a hiatus in between. The older stage has a different chemical composition than the recent one and is heavily eroded by glaciers. The most recent parasitic vents were active about 20,000 years ago and the volcano could erupt again.

Geography and geomorphology 

Mount Discovery lies next to Mount Morning and is separated from it by the Discovery Glacier. The volcano was originally described in the early to middle 20th century, before more detailed analyses took place in the 1970s, 1980s and 2000s.

Mount Morning has been defined as a  large shield volcano that consists of a central volcano overlying an older volcanic complex. With a volume of  it is one of the largest volcanoes in the region. Fissure vents have produced at least 185 parasitic vents on the slopes of Mount Morning. They are cinder cones, fissure ridges, lava domes and volcanic necks, and their diameters range from a few metres to a few hundred metres. Many of the vents form alignments, some cone craters overlap or the vents themselves have linear shapes. These linear patterns define northeast-southwest trends, with a minor northwest-southeast alignment. Lava flows emanate from cones and make up the present-day surface of the volcano.

Mount Morning is almost entirely covered with snow and ice except where it is ablated by southerly winds. Outcrops of volcanic rocks form the north-northeastern Riviera Ridge and northeastern Hurricane Ridge on the northern flank, Mason Spur on the southern flank and on Helms Bluff on the eastern flank. Gandalf Ridge is a promontory formed by northward-tilted debris and penetrated by Dikes. It is located at the foot of Hurricane Ridge, and Pinnacle Valley is located on the Riviera Ridge. Dikes, lava domes, lava flows and pyroclastic deposits are found in outcrops. Mason Spur also contains breccias from pillow lavas, while Gandalf Ridge features a diamictite and a cross-cutting fault. Mason Spurr was considered by Martin et al. 2021 to be a separate volcano from Mount Morning.

Owing to the lack of running water, the main edifice (unlike Mason Spur) is uneroded and parasitic vents have a young appearance. Glacial erosion has eroded some parts of the volcano, leaving volcanic necks in Pinnacle Valley, has etched glacial striations into exposed volcanic rocks and deposited glacial till. The Vereyken Glacier descends the northeastern slopes of Mount Morning between Hurricane Ridge and Riviera Ridge. Moraines occur on these two ridges and moraines dating to the Wisconsin glaciation have been reported. Glaciers descending from Mount Morning feed the Koettlitz Glacier. Several lakes are found on the volcano and at its foot, including Lake Morning at the end of the Riviera Ridge and Lake Discovery at the foot of the Hurricane and Gandalf ridges.

Geology 

The West Antarctic Rift is a major geological feature in Antarctica and one of Earth's largest continental rifts. It is a region of active crustal extension and spreading, which may be ongoing today. This volcanic group has erupted alkaline lavas during the course of the Cenozoic. It is subdivided into three provinces, the Hallett, the Melbourne and the Erebus province; Mount Morning is the southernmost volcano of the Erebus province.

Mount Morning rises from a Paleozoic basement, the Koettlitz Group which crops out close to Gandalf Ridge in the form of granite and metasedimentary rocks. Based on rocks erupted by Mount Morning, the crust appears to be thin and has a calc-alkaline composition. Tectonic sutures in this basement may have allowed magma to ascend to the surface in the Mount Morning region.

Composition 

Basanite is the dominant rock of outcrops, with phonolite less common and picrobasalt and tephrite rare. Outcrops of older rocks include mugearite, rhyolite and trachyte. Textures range from porphyritic to seriate. Various phenocrysts are found within the volcanic rocks, including aegirine, augite, clinopyroxene, alkali feldspar, kaersutite, nepheline, olivine, plagioclase, quartz and sanidine. Aegirine, aenigmatite, amphibole, augite, clinopyroxene, alkali feldspar, glass, iron oxide-titanium oxide, nepheline, plagioclase and quartz make up the groundmass. The volcanic rocks contain xenoliths consisting of syenite and of rocks from older stages of Mount Morning activity. Spinel peridotite and less commonly clinopyroxenite, dunite, harzburgite, lherzolite, norite, pyroxenite and websterite have been reported as xenoliths.

The early volcanic rocks of Mount Morning are comparable to mildly alkaline rocks from Mount Melbourne, while the more alkaline late volcanic rocks resemble these from Mount Erebus. The older rocks define the "Mason Spurr lineage" while the younger ones are referred to as the "Riviera Ridge lineage". Basaltic rocks are concentrated on the lower slopes, while phonolite is mainly found in the upper sector of Mount Morning. The composition changes between the early and late volcanic activity of Mount Morning may be due to alteration in crustal magma processes.

Eruption history 

Mount Morning has been active during the Miocene, Pliocene and Pleistocene. Argon-argon dating and potassium-argon dating have been used to infer the duration of volcanic activity  at Mount Morning. Gandalf Ridge has yielded ages of 18.7±0.3-15.5±0.5 million years, Pinnacle Valley 15.2±0.2-13.0±0.3 million years, Mason Spur 12.8±0.4-11.4±0.2 million years, rocks below the summit of 6.13±0.20-~1.00 million years and 4.51±0.31-0.02 million years on other formations.  Some of these eruptions may have deposited volcanic ash over the McMurdo Sound area and in the Transantarctic Mountains. Even older activity at Mount Morning may be recorded in volcanic deposits from Cape Roberts which go back to 24.1 million years ago. This is a long lifespan for a volcano by Antarctic standards, and may be due to tectonic factors that kept magma generation focused on Mount Morning for a long time. Loading by glaciers may have influenced volcanic activity at Mount Morning.

Volcanic activity has been subdivided into two phases separated by a hiatus, an early phase lasting between 11.4±0.2-18.7±0.3 million years ago and a late phase from 6.13±0.02 million years ago to almost present-day. These phases are also known as the phase I or the Mason Spur Lineage, and as the phase II or the Riviera Ridge Lineage. The early phase produced mildly alkaline volcanic rocks, the late phase which makes up most of the outcrops strongly alkaline rocks. The early phase has produced ignimbrites from a caldera at Mason Spur, an otherwise rare type of volcanoes in Antarctica. The older rocks have undergone significant glaciation, while the younger ones are largely uneroded and make up the present-day edifice. Volcanic activity mostly occurred under the atmosphere, with the exception of some lavas that may have been erupted in a subaqueous environment and hyaloclastites which have been used to infer that glaciers existed there 15.4 million years ago. Volcanic activity was focused along geologic lineaments on Mount Morning, which were reused during more recent eruptions.

Eruptions took place at Mount Morning about 20,000 years ago, forming well-preserved cinder cones. In the 1960s thermal anomalies were observed at Gandalf Ridge, implying that the volcano may still be active, although ground surveys did not detect fumarolic activity. Thus, Mount Morning was considered dormant by Martin, Cooper and Dunlap 2010 and might be the source of tephra layers found in the area.

History and name 

The volcano was discovered by the Discovery Expedition in 1901-1904 and named after a relief ship that took part in the expedition.

See also
 Barlow Rocks
 List of volcanoes in Antarctica

References

Sources

External links
 
 
 
 
 
 
 
 Polar Discovery: Mount Morning Lava Flows

Polygenetic shield volcanoes
Volcanoes of Victoria Land
Volcanoes of the Ross Dependency
Hillary Coast
Scott Coast
Pleistocene shield volcanoes